Christian Schreiber (born 25 November 1977) is an Austrian football coach and former professional player.

Career
Born in Spittal an der Drau, Schreiber played as a midfielder for VST Völkermarkt, Austria Wien, WSG Wattens, SVG Bleiburg and SV Spittal.

He managed SK Austria Klagenfurt between 2018 and 2019.

References

1977 births
Living people
Austrian footballers
FK Austria Wien players
WSG Tirol players
SV Spittal players
Austrian Football Bundesliga players
Association football midfielders
Austrian football managers
People from Spittal an der Drau
Footballers from Carinthia (state)